Lean product development (LPD) is a lean approach to counter the challenges of product development, notably:
 Lack of innovative solutions
 Long development cycle times
 Many redevelopment cycles
 High development costs
 Long production cycle times
 High production costs

See also
Design for lean manufacturing
Muntzing
Toyota Production System

History of lean product development
Toyota started its journey with lean product development at Toyota Loom Works (see History of Toyota). Their early approach is notably different from Lean manufacturing that became famous through the book "The Machine that changed the world".

When Toyota started manufacturing cars, there was a difference in manufacturing conditions between Japan and the USA. Toyota had few educated engineers and little prior experience. Car companies in US employed a well-educated work force in the cities and benefited from the research and student skill-sets of established engineering schools. To tackle this shortfall in knowledge and experience, Toyota conducted an incremental approach to development that built on their existing knowledge and became the basis of the lean systems Toyota uses today.

Allen Ward studied Toyota’s lean product development system and found parallels with the US airplane industry. For instance, the Wright brothers’ method of constructing their airplanes became one of the legacies they passed on to the aviation industry. This approach enabled the USA to create one of World War II's most successful fighter planes from scratch in the short span of six months. After the war, Toyota incorporated many of the airline industry's findings into its own product development methodology.

Differences between lean product development and lean production
While some basic principles and guidelines are applicable across Lean product development and  Lean production (such as waste reduction), many applications of lean process for development have focused more on the production approach.

The purpose of production is to manufacture products reliably within margins of control. The flow of value is physically evident, and the link between cause and effect is easy to see. For example, feedback on adjusting the speed of production is immediately realized in an increase or decrease in rejected items. Any decisions made must be based on best practice.

On the other hand, the purpose of product development is to design new products that improve the lives of customers. This is a complex space where the flow of value can only be discerned at an abstract level and where cause and effect might be separated by time and space. For example, feedback on the decision to design a certain feature will not be received until the product has been built and is in the hands of the customer. This means that decisions are made on short-cycle experimentation, prototyping, set-based design, and emergent practice. A premium is placed on creating reusable knowledge and reducing risk at handover points.

An essential point about these differences is summarized in the advice Jim Womack gives Harley Davidson: "Don't try to bring lean manufacturing upstream to product development. The application of Lean in product development and manufacturing are different. Some aspects may look similar, but they are not! Be leery of an expert with experience in lean manufacturing that claims to know product development" 

The most common high level concepts associated with lean product development are:
 Creation of re-usable knowledge. Knowledge is created and maintained so that it can be leveraged for successive products or iterations. 
 Set-based concurrent engineering. Different stages of product development run simultaneously rather than consecutively to decrease development time, improve productivity, and reduce costs.  
 Teams of responsible experts. Lean product development organizations develop cross-functional teams and reward competence building in teams and individuals.
 Cadence and pull. Managers of lean product development organizations develop autonomous teams, where engineers plan their own work and work their own plans.  
 Visual management. Visualization is a main enabler of lean product development. 
 Entrepreneurial system designer. The lean product development organization makes one person responsible for the engineering and aesthetic design, and market and business success, of the product.
 Flow management.

Results of lean product development 
Lean product development has been claimed to produce the following results:
 Increase innovation ten-fold
 Increase introduction of new products 400%-500% 

Companies such as Toyota can attribute their success to lean product development. In 2000, Toyota launched 14 new products, a larger product line than GM's entire product offering. At that point, Toyota had just 70,000 employees while GM had more than five times as many.

Applicability of lean product development 

Researchers divide product development projects accordingly to their need drivers:
 Wished: there is no such product on the market, only a wish for such a product. These projects can be on the edge of what is possible to do.
 Wanted: there are only a few basic similar products on the market that usually require improvement.
 Needed: there are enough products in existence so knowledge about this is abundant on the market.

For example, the mobile phone was a Wanted product in the 1990s because it was on the leading edge of technology. Today it is regarded as a Needed product. It is common in the market. There is enough knowledge in the public domain so that even small companies can make a good mobile phone.

Product development methods can be classified according to whether they are focused on handling stable or non-stable conditions. Lean product development is a dynamic method of product development that handles unstable conditions.

The influence of need drivers and stability (or lack of stability) on product development are illustrated in the table below.

Related concepts 
 Lean startup
 Lean project management

Notes and references 

Exchange ref 12 with:
Ottosson, S. (2016): Developing Sustainable Product Innovations,  page 112
Design
Environmental design
Lean manufacturing
Product development